Giyani is a town situated in the North-eastern part of Limpopo Province, South Africa. It is the administrative capital of the Mopani District Municipality, and a former capital of the defunct Gazankulu bantustan. The town of Giyani has seven sections: Section A, Section D1, Section D2, Section E, Section F, Kremetart, and Giyani CBD. Risinga View and Church View are new residential areas in Giyani, but fall under local Traditional Leaders. The Giyani CBD is nicknamed Benstore, and this name is commonly used by residents of the region. Giyani is surrounded by a number of villages with rich Tsonga cultural activities, administered by the Greater Giyani Local Municipality. 

Prof. Hudson Ntsanwisi, the former Chief minister of Gazankulu, played a vital role in establishing the town. Giyani is situated at the intersection between R578 road (South Africa) and R81. It is located in the heart of the Limpopo Bushveld, on the northern bank of the Klein Letaba River west of Kruger National Park. Situated in the northern portion of former Gazankulu, Giyani was established in the 1960s as the administrative centre for the Tsonga people. Giyani lies 470 km north east of Johannesburg by road, 104 km from Tzaneen, 105 km from the Phalaborwa Gate of the Kruger National Park and 35 km from Malamulele.

In 1969 the Gazankulu Government named a new ward at Elim Hospital 'Giyani Ward' in honour of the Gazankulu capital.

History

Giyani was established during the 1960s as a capital city of Gazankulu, on land belonging to the Homu Royal Family. The Risinga Community (under headman Chabalala) originally came from the Elim district, next to the township of Waterval. 

The Old Parliament Buildings in Giyani, the ministerial houses as well as the Palace of the Chief Minister of Gazankulu were built on what used to be the Chief's Kraal and headquarters of the Risinga Community. Across the main road, the Risinga Community used to drive their herds of cattle for grazing at a place known today as Giyani Golf course. Giyani Section E, Section A, Section D1 and D2 and CBD of Giyani, known as Bendstore were villages of the Risinga Community. The Risinga Community was forcefully removed from their land during the 1960s in order to make way for the new Capital of Gazankulu and were relocated at the foothills of Man'ombe Mountain in Homu Block 14 and Makoxa Village with their chief, Hosi Homu Chabalala.

Land claims 
The Risinga Community, under Hosi Homu Chabalala successfully claimed back their land, which includes; Giyani Section E, Section A, Section D1 and D2 and some parts of Section F, the whole of Man'ombe Mountain nature reserve and the entire Giyani CBD was given back to Hosi Homu Chabalala under the settlements scheme with Government. While the other Chabalala headman, Hosi Siyandhanim, successfully claimed some parts of Giyani Section E and section F and the western portion of Giyani CBD, Mapuve, Jim Nghalalume and Siyandhani as a host village.

Hosi Maswanganyi (Mavhusa) also successfully claimed back their land, which includes: Gandlanani, Basani, N'wamankena, Dingamadzi, Sikhunyani, Kremetart, Dzingidzingi A, B and C, Bode A and B, Mencisi and Maswanganyi Village. Hosi Khakhala also successfully claimed back their land, which includes: Muyexe Block 01, Mninginisi Block 02, Mninginisi Block 03, N'wadzekudzeku Block 04, Shivulani Block 05A, Mbatlo Block 05B, Mavalani Block 06, Thomo Block 07, Khakhala Block 08A, Mhlava Block 08B, and Gawula Block 09 Village.

Culture
Most residents of Giyani speak Xitsonga as their first language. The Tsonga women perform the xibelani dance'and called the dance Xigaza, the men enjoy mpuluto and makhwaya. The Tsonga people also engage in a custom dance called mchongolo''. Xibelani is an African skirt designed to make the wearer's hips look bigger so that the hip movement during the xibelani dance can be more apparent. The Tsonga people have their own distinct music when the xibelani dance is performed.

The staple diet in Giyani is maize porridge (vuswa or pap in Afrikaans and rice often eaten with meat, chicken and vegetables (matsavu)).

"Giyani" is one of the tracks on the album "Third World Child" by Johnny Clegg and his band Savuka, written about leaving the stress of Johannesburg to get some peace and quiet in Giyani.

Climate 
Giyani is situated within the sub-tropical zone. It can be very hot in summer, reaching a maximum temperature of 41 °C in summer and 25 °C during winter. Winters are mild during the day and cold during the nights.

Rainfall season is between September and March, while the winter season is from April to August.

Economy
Giyani's economy is predominately rural-based. Cattle ranching and production of maize, peanuts, tomatoes, potatoes, mangoes and bananas forms the backbone of farming. 
With the economic boom, Giyani has now become a major retail and entertainment centre for the local population. Modern shopping centres, with all the well-known chain stores presented, have vastly uplifted the local trade.

Residential areas 
Residential area in the surrounding the Giyani CBD include Giyani Section A, E and F, D1, D2 &  Kremetart

Two more residential areas being Risinga view and Church view aka Homu block 15 have recently been established. These two fall under local Traditional Leaders. 

Other communities under Traditional Leaders (Tihosi) includes Siyandhani, Dzingi-dzingi, ka-Ndhambi, Mageva, Bambeni, Daniel (Makhwivirini), Maphata, Munghonghoma, Ngove, Khaxani, Mphagani, Xitlakati, Mayephu, N'wa-Marhanga, Xamfana, Nkomo A, Kheyi, Loloka, Maswanganyi, Mbhedle, Mushiane, Mayephu, Dzumeri Township, Hluvukani, Khaxani(Mhintlwa), Makhuva, Xawela Bloc 23, Xikhumba, Mbawula, Phalaubeni, Hlomela, Ndindani, Vuhehli, Nkomo B, Nkomo C, N'wa-Khuwani, Bambeni, Mzilela, Matsotsosela, Dzumeri RDP,  Homu, Sikhunyani, Mninginisi, Xikukwani,Mavalani, Nkurhi, Tomu, Basani.

Education
Some of the independent schools in Giyani include Khanyisa Education Centre, Risinga Secondary School,  Nkwangulatilo Education centre, Nyukani Education Centre, High Quality Education Centres, Giyani College of Technology and Management and Muhluri Combine School.
Public schools include Kheto Nxumayo Agricultural High School and Giyani High School.

Tertiary Institutions in or near Giyani

Giyani Campus Of Nursing College
Limpopo Province College of Nursing
Letaba FET College (Giyani Campus)
Giyani Education Multipurpose Centre

Roads 
The R81 is the major road that runs through Giyani. It links Giyani to Polokwane and Malamulele and joins the R524 to Punda Maria entrance gate of the Kruger National Park. The R81 joins the N1 to Pretoria and Johannesburg in Polokwane, next to the Mall of the North.

Sports 
Giyani Stadium is the home of National First Division club Dynamos F.C. (South Africa) Giyani has been home to Giyani United and Giyani Classic.

On the athletics front the 100 metre sprint ace Peter "Manero" Ngobeni stayed in Giyani Section A during the 1980s.

FiFA Referee late Herman Mashava was from Dzumeri, Mageva Village to be precise.

Notable People 
 Phillemon Hlungwani
 Penny Penny
 Musa Keys
 Gladwin Shitolo
 Tinyiko Victor Hlungwani 
 Kate Chauke

Tourism 
Giyani's location in the warm African Bushveld makes it attractive for both local and international visitors. The Giyani Golf course is home to zebra, giraffe, bushbuck and some other herbivores, however the viewing of these animals has not yet been commercialised.

At the moment, there are a number of Bed and Breakfast and Guest House facilities for tourists. A few are: Hanyani Lodge, Riverside Guest House, Xisaka Bed and Breakfast, Tihosi Guest House, Elridge Mountain Lodge, Rosanna Guest House, Nwayitelo Lodge and Mopani Guest House.

Limpopo Lodge (formerly Giyani Hotel) is situated in the centre of town and managed by the Oasis Group. Man'ombe Nature Reserve is located 6 km east of Giyani.

Giyani also borders Kruger National Park on the Western side of the Northern Region. Historically, Giyani had no entry-point to the Kruger National Park even though Giyani shares a long border with Kruger National Park. There was a plan to open a new gate, known as Shangoni Gate at Muyexe Village, 30 km North-East of Giyani town. This gate was supposed to bring much-needed development in the nearby villages of Muyexe, Mahonisi and Mtititi where unemployment is 80%. These villages have been historically poor, despite the fact that they are bordering one of the world best safari destinations.

References

Populated places in the Greater Giyani Local Municipality
1960s establishments in South Africa